Thomas Eustace, 1st Viscount Baltinglass  (-1549) was an Anglo-Irish noble who achieved wealth and influence by prudently remaining loyal to the English Crown. He was born circa 1480 at Caslemartin, County Kildare.

Family
He was the son of Richard Eustace (died before 1496), younger son of Sir Edward FitzEustace, Lord Deputy of Ireland, and Anne, daughter of Robert Eustace of Ballyloughrane. He married Margaret Talbot, daughter of Sir Peter Talbot of Malahide Castle and Catherine FitzGerald. He died on 31 July 1549.

On 14 December 1496, when only sixteen, he succeeded his uncle, Rowland FitzEustace, 1st Baron Portlester, in the family estates. Portlester's daughter Alison married Gerald FitzGerald, 8th Earl of Kildare and was the grandmother of Silken Thomas, hence the strong pressure on the Eustace clan to join Thomas' rebellion.

Career
He was High Sheriff of Kildare in 1523 and was knighted, but little else is known of him until about 1534.

During the Silken Thomas rebellion, when the Eustace family were deeply divided, due to the close family tie between the Eustace and Fitzgerald families, he remained loyal to Henry VIII and was duly rewarded for his assistance in putting down the rebellion by being created Baron Kilcullen in the Peerage of Ireland in September 1535. He is said to have possessed one-half of County Wicklow, together with his family's existing possessions in Kildare and County Meath, and benefited from the Dissolution of the Monasteries.

He played a prominent part in the Irish Parliament of 1541-2. The Parliament is chiefly remembered for passing the Crown of Ireland Act 1542 by which Henry VIII took the title King of Ireland, in preference to the earlier Lordship of Ireland.

As a reward for further actions in putting down the rebellion, he was created Viscount Baltinglass, a title also in the Peerage of Ireland, on 29 June 1541. His principal residence was Harristown, Naas South, County Kildare; he died at New Abbey, Kilcullen.

Children
Children of Sir Thomas Eustace, 1st Viscount Baltinglass and Margaret Talbot
 Richard Eustace
 Alexander Eustace
 Robert Eustace
 John Eustace, High Sheriff of Kildare
 Rowland Eustace, 2nd Viscount Baltinglass+ b. c 1505, d. 31 Mar 1578
 Anne Eustace, who married firstly an O'Toole and secondly Nicholas Eustace
 Janet Eustace, who married firstly Gerald Sutton and secondly Maurice Fitzgerald
 Margaret Eustace who married George Burnell
 Catherine Eustace who married firstly James FitzGerald and secondly Gerald Plunkett, younger son of Robert Plunkett, 5th Baron of Dunsany.

References
G.E. Cokayne; with Vicary Gibbs, H.A. Doubleday, Geoffrey H. White, Duncan Warrand and Lord Howard de Walden, editors, The Complete Peerage of England, Scotland, Ireland, Great Britain and the United Kingdom, Extant, Extinct or Dormant, new ed., 13 volumes in 14 (1910–1959; reprint in 6 volumes, Gloucester, U.K.: Alan Sutton Publishing, 2000), volume I, page 395. Hereinafter cited as The Complete Peerage.

1549 deaths
Peers of Ireland created by Henry VIII
16th-century Anglo-Irish people
People from County Kildare
People from County Wicklow
High Sheriffs of Kildare
Members of the Irish House of Lords
1480 births in Ireland
Thomas